Turley is both a surname and a given name. Notable people with the name include:

Surname:
Anna Turley, British politician
Bob Turley,  American professional baseball player
George Turley (1931–2010), English lawn bowler and (soccer) footballer
Harry Turley (1859–1929), Australian politician
Helen Turley, American winemaker 
Jim Turley, CEO of Ernst & Young
Jonathan Turley, professor at George Washington University Law School
Kyle Turley, American football player
Larry Turley, owner, Turley Wine Cellars
Myra Turley, American film and television actress
Neil Turley, British Rugby League player
Nik Turley, American baseball player
Thomas B. Turley (1845–1910), US Senator
Vashti Turley Murphy (1884–1960), co-founder of Delta Sigma Theta

Given name:
Turley Richards, American musician

See also
Turley, Missouri, ghost town
Turley, New Mexico, census-designated place
Turley, Oklahoma, census-designated place
Turley's Mill, Arroyo Hondo, Taos County, New Mexico, scene of the Taos Revolt of 1847